Mary Bayard Morgan Wootten (1875–1959) was an American photographer. She named Pepsi Cola and created its iconic logo for her neighbor Caleb Bradham, who invented the iconic drink.

Biography 
Wootten was born in New Bern, North Carolina in 1875 to Mary and Rufus Morgan. Wootten attended New Bern public schools and then studied at the State Normal and Industrial College (now the University of North Carolina at Greensboro) from 1892 to 1894. After college, she briefly taught art at the Arkansas School for the Deaf and the Georgia School for the Deaf. When her husband Charles Wootten abandoned her, she returned home to New Bern to support her two sons by painting flowers on china and fine dresses. She even taxidermied animals including an American alligator which is in the Berlin Museum of natural history. She received basic instruction in photography from Edward Gerrock and Ignatius Wadsworth Brock, whom she called Nate. She opened her own photography studio in the shack next to her home on East Front Street in New Bern in 1903 borrowing several cameras and equipment from Gerrock.

BW opened a second studio in 1913 on Fort Bragg calling it The Photo Hut. Making exclusive images for the North Carolina National Guard. From this she became the first woman in the North Carolina National Guard. In 1920 she moved to Chapel Hill, where she specialized in portrait photography for the Yackety Yack, the yearbook for the University of North Carolina at Chapel Hill, as well as official photography for the Carolina Playmakers (now PlayMakers Repertory Company). She lived in Chapel Hill from 1928 to 1954. The theater work introduced her to the writer Thomas Wolfe, whom she photographed on many occasions.

Wootten once instructed her employee Rudy Faircloth to lower her over a cliff to make a photograph of Linville Falls, a famous natural landmark in North Carolina.

 Anthony Lilly is also a New Bern native who is Wootten's biographer and is writing a script for the motion picture about Wootten's life. Lilly is Wootten's leading expert on her life and has the largest collection of Wootten's personal belongings including letter's, thousands of her original prints, glass plates and her entire photographic studio.

Her photographs illustrated six books, including Backwoods America by Charles Morrow Wilson, 1934; Cabins in the Laurel by Muriel Sheppard, 1935; Old Homes and Gardens of North Carolina by Archibald Henderson, 1939; and From My Highest Hill by Olive Tilford Dargan, 1941. Wootten is buried in the family plot in historic Cedar Grove cemetery in New Bern NC.

Work 
Wootten was the first woman to make a photograph from an airplane in 1914, in New Bern, North Carolina. Wootten was also the first woman in the National Guard, making the rank of Adjutant General and Chief of Publicity. Her uncle was North Carolina Congressman, Hap Barden. Wootten utilized Barden's power by providing images she made of a deteriorating Camp Bragg. Her images of soldiers forced to live in the poorest of conditions helped save it from closure. Today, we know it as Fort Bragg.

Wootten's photography illustrated five books during her lifetime, including Charleston: Azalias and Old Bricks,  North Carolina Homes and Gardens, and From My Highest Hill. Her images fill UNC at Chapel Hill year books and newspapers, while her larger than life pictorialist photographs line North Carolina State Government building walls and Court Houses. Anthony Lilly, a New Bern native, has written a script which is in pre-production about Wootten's incredible life. Lilly also possess the largest collection of Wootten's images, prints, Glass plates and personal belongings. He also has Wootten's entire 1904-1959 studio contents, including her first camera and all lighting. Lilly will fill the Wootten-Moulton Museum in New Bern North Carolina with these treasures. A book by Jerry Cotton titled Light and Air was a brief description in words and pictures about Wootten. Anthony Paul Lilly, a New Bern native as well, has written a feature script about Wootten's life and is also publishing a series of books with Fahey/ Klein Gallery in Beverly Hills about Wootten in conjunction with UNC at Chapel Hill.

His Wootten-Moulton Museum collection holds hundreds of family letters and business papers detailing the working relationship with Caleb Bradham. During his research he also uncovered Wootten's original concept drawings of the famous drink.

In addition to her work as a pioneering photographer and artist, Wootten was a staunch advocate for women's shelter who used her standing and reputation throughout the south to aid women's organizations including the Women's Missionary League. In 1915 she became the President of the League's publicity department, creating all official portraits.

In 1913 her portraiture became popular at Camp Bragg. Delivery of her portraits to Gregg Cherry, at the time an ordinary soldier at Camp Bragg, led to a rush of orders.

Wootten was granted permission to open a photographic studio on the base, (The Photo Hut ) and Wooten eventually received the first commission for a woman in the National Guard. Her early client, Lieutenant Cherry, became North Carolina's 61st Governor. Cherry Point air station and base was named after Cherry, as well as Cherry Hospital.

The Wootten-Moulton Studio received The Showmanship Award from The Walt Disney Company for outstanding achievements in professional photography.

Awards and exhibitions 
Wootten received the North Carolina State Award for "Most Beautiful Photographs of Trees in America" from the American Forestry Association in 1934 for her photograph Live Oaks.

Her work has been exhibited at Harvard University, the Century of Progress Exposition, the Academy of Arts in Richmond, Virginia, and in numerous locations in North Carolina.
 1923, May 3–31: International salon of the Pictorial Photographers of America. Held at the galleries of the Art Center, 65 East 56th Street, New York City, NY.
 1994: "I won't make a picture unless the moon is right--" : early architectural photography of North Carolina by Frances Benjamin Johnston and Bayard Wootten. North Carolina State University, Visual Arts Center.

Works 
 Cotten, Jerry W. (1998) Light and Air: The Photography of Bayard Wootten. North Carolina: The University of North Carolina Press.  
 Dargan, Olive Tilford (1998) From My Highest Hill: Carolina Mountain Folks. Photographs by Bayard Wootten. Tennessee: University of Tennessee Press.   
 Henderson, Archibald (1939) Old Homes and Gardens of North Carolina. Photographs by Bayard Wootten. North Carolina: University of North Carolina Press. OCLC Number: 1511096 
 Higgins, Anthony (Author), Wootten, Bayard (Photographer) (1939) New Castle, Delaware, 1651-1939. Houghton Mifflin. OCLC Number: 7944271 
 Stoney, Samuel Gaillard (Author), Wootten, Bayard (Photographer) (1939) Charleston: Azaleas and Old Bricks. Houghton Mifflin. OCLC Number: 498875680 
 Sheppard, Muriel Earley (1935) Cabins in the Laurel. Photographs by Bayard Wootten. North Carolina: Chapel Hill Books   
  Wilson, Charles Morrow (1935) Backwoods America. Illustrations by Bayard Wootten. Chapel Hill: University of North Carolina Press. OCLC Number: 578736164
  Exhibition Catalog: "I won't make a picture unless the moon is right--" : early architectural photography of North Carolina by Frances Benjamin Johnston and Bayard Wootten, North Carolina State University, Visual Arts Center (1994). Raleigh, NC: Preservation North Carolina. OCLC number: 31321581
  Exhibition Catalog: International salon of the Pictorial Photographers of America : held at the galleries of the Art Center, sixty five East Fifty Sixth Street, New York City : from May third to May thirty-first one thousand nine hundred twenty three. Pictorial Photographers of America (1923) OCLC Number: 56057729

References 

An interview from The New York Times with Wootten's official biographer Anthony Lilly
https://nyti.ms/2FrDvgB

Further reading 
 

This New York Times article was inspired by Anthony Lilly, Wootten's official biographer.

1875 births
1959 deaths
University of North Carolina at Greensboro alumni
Aerial photographers
American portrait photographers
Pioneers of photography
19th-century American photographers
20th-century American photographers
19th-century American women photographers
20th-century American women photographers